Felipe de Liaño (died 1625) was a Spanish painter.  Antonio Palomino would dubbed him Little Titian (Tiziano pequeño).

Born in Madrid. He was pupil of Alonso Sánchez Coello, and may have completed some etchings in Italy that are signed by “Teodoro Felipe de Liagno”.  He executed the portrait of Álvaro de Bazán, first Marquese de Santa Cruz for the emperor Rudolf. Lope de Vega in his poetic epitaph (1602) said to the effect that  “Nature killed him because he stole its paintbrushes”.

References

Lasalle, Christian, Felipe de Liaño: el pequeño Tiziano (Felipe de Liaño: The Little Titian, Boletín del Museo e Instituto Camón Aznar, II-III (1981), p. 51-84.

1625 deaths
Artists from Madrid
17th-century Spanish painters
Spanish male painters
Year of birth unknown